The Nyokon language, also known as Nyo'o (ninyɔ̃'ɔ̃), is a Southern Bantoid language of Cameroon.

References

Mbam languages
Languages of Cameroon